Maple Hills may refer to:

 Maple Heights-Lake Desire, Washington
 Maple Mountains, Czech Republic